Skäggetorp is a city district in Linköping, Sweden, located northwest of downtown. The buildings are mostly two-story and three-story buildings, both condominiums and apartment buildings, which are built around a large center with office buildings, shops, bank, pharmacy and other services. In the area there are medical and dental offices, schools, child care, nursing home, church, playing fields and Ullevi allotment area.

Construction in Skäggetorp began from the south in the 1960s, in the 1970s the Ullevi area was built and in 1986 more apartment buildings were constructed at Skäggetorps center. Skäggetorp was part of the Million Programme.

The population was 8,448 in December 2008, in 1965 the population was only 76. At its peak in 1979 the population of Skäggetorp was 9,901. In 2012, 45.1% of the district's residents were of foreign origin. In 2019 the percentage of people with foreign origin had risen to 56.4%. The unemployment rate among 16 to 64 year-olds in Skäggetorp in March 2020 was at 18.3%.

Districts adjoining Skäggetorp are Tornby, Gottfridsberg and Ryd.

In its December 2015 report, the Swedish Police placed the district in the most severe category of urban areas with high crime rates. On 14 April 2022, the far-right Danish politician Rasmus Paludan was to hold a speech about Islam in Skäggetorp, and planned to burn the Quran. Riots in response to the anti-Muslim demonstration broke out and several police cars were set on fire.

References

Geography of Linköping